Tears of Stone is an album by the Chieftains, released in 1999. Each track features a different female guest artist or group, with the exception of Jim Corr of the Corrs, Jimmy and John of the Rankins and longtime Bonnie Raitt bassist James Hutchinson. Guests are listed below in parentheses.

Track listing
"Never Give All the Heart" – 2:50 (Anúna and Brenda Fricker)
"A Stór Mo Chroí" – 3:46 (Bonnie Raitt)
"The Lowlands of Holland" – 3:46 (Natalie Merchant)
"The Magdalene Laundries" – 4:59 (Joni Mitchell backing vocals Screaming Orphans)
"Jimmy Mó Mhíle Stór" – 4:37 (The Rankin Family)
"I Know My Love" – 3:54 (The Corrs)
"Factory Girl" – 4:23 (Sinéad O'Connor)
"Deserted Soldier" – 4:39 (Mary Chapin Carpenter)
"Ye Rambling Boys of Pleasure" – 4:33 (Loreena McKennitt)
"Sake in the Jar" – 4:28 (Akiko Yano)
"Raglan Road" – 6:19 (Joan Osborne)
"Siúil A Rún" – 4:35 (Sissel Kyrkjebø)
"The Fiddling Ladies" – 10:23 (Natalie MacMaster, Eileen Ivers, Máire Breatnach, and Annbjørg Lien)
"Danny Boy" – 5:28 (Diana Krall)

The version released in China also included a bonus track, "Tear Lake", featuring Chinese singer Dadawa.

Charts

Certifications

References

1999 albums
The Chieftains albums
Bertelsmann Music Group albums
Collaborative albums